Centruroides nigrescens is a species of scorpion in the family Buthidae. It is native to Mexico.

References

Centruroides
Animals described in 1898
Endemic scorpions of Mexico